Lineman or linesman may refer to:

In personal roles:
Lineworker, one who installs and maintains electrical power, telephone, or telegraph lines
Lineman (gridiron football), a position in American football
Head linesman, the American football official in charge of the chain crew 
Assistant referee (association football) or linesman
Linesmen, officials in ice hockey
Line umpire, an official in tennis

In other uses:
Western Union splice or Lineman splice, a type of electrical wiring splice
"The Lineman", a song composed by Sam Spence for Associated Production Music
 La Linea (TV series) or Lineman, an Italian animated short series
Linesman/Mediator Air Defence RADAR system

See also
"Wichita Lineman", a song written by Jimmy Webb in 1968, first recorded by Glen Campbell and widely covered since